Palpita vitiensis is a moth in the family Crambidae. It was described by John Clayton in 2008 and is found on Fiji.

References

Moths described in 2008
Palpita
Moths of Fiji